Dirt Devil is an American vacuum cleaner and floor care company. It is the brand and subsidiary of Techtronic Industries, and its corporate legal name is now TTI Floor Care North America.

Company history
The company was founded in 1905 in Cleveland, Ohio by Philip Geier as P. A. Geier Co., later to be renamed Royal Appliance Manufacturing Co in 1953. When the St. Clair Avenue location was closed it became the Ohio Technical College originally called Ohio Diesel Mechanics School in 1968. The original building remains and is currently the Julius A. Brenner Visitors and Administrative Center.

Originally the company made vacuum cleaners using aluminum casings, and also manufactured mixers, hair dryers and washing machines. The vacuum cleaner design used the "dirty air" vacuum design with the electric motor positioned horizontally, the turbine blades at the front and a downward facing nozzle in contact with the cleaning surface. The dirt was collected at the vacuum exhaust in a heavy cloth bag that needed to be shaken of the collected dirt on a regular basis. 

During the mid-1960s the cloth bag that collected dirt changed to an inner paper filter bag, replacing the cloth bag that was held closed with a sliding metal clamp. To empty the dirt, it was periodically detached from the motor exhaust and shaken to remove accumulated dirt.

In 1937 the first hand held vacuum cleaner was introduced, called the "Royal Prince" and was offered along with the upright and cannister models. The upright model was offered as three models, called the  Standard, the Super, and the Purifier and a rubber belt driven brush was incorporated into the detachable carpet nozzle.

In 1984 Royal introduced the Dirt Devil Hand Vac, to compete as a lower-cost, mass-market alternative to the existing Royal Prince line of all-metal hand vacuums, as well to compete with the Black & Decker Dustbuster. The line eventually evolved to include more models, including upright vacuum cleaners, most bearing distinctive red plastic cases.

Originally the products bore the name "Royal Dirt Devil," but as they grew in popularity and overtook Royal's other products in sales, the company chose to make Dirt Devil the primary brand name, gradually shrinking and then phasing out the Royal name. By the end of the 1990s, the Royal name appeared only on the specification sticker, and the cloth bag bore the Dirt Devil logo instead of the traditional Royal insignia. In 2003 Royal Appliance Mfg. Co. was sold to Techtronic Industries of Hong Kong. TTI also owns Oreck, Hoover, Vax, and other vacuum cleaner brands. Royal continued to manufacture all-metal vacuum cleaners for the consumer and commercial markets until 2018.

Products and marketing

Classic Red Hand Vac 
In 1984 Royal introduced the Dirt Devil Hand Vac. It has a rotating brush for cleanup on stairs and furniture, plus a hose for hard to reach spots. The hand vac became the largest selling handheld vacuum in the United States, selling more than 25 million units.

In 1996 the Ultra Hand Vac was introduced with more suction and a built-in stretch hose and crevice tool. In 2005 Dirt Devil gave the hand vac a makeover calling it the Dirt Devil Classic Hand Vac.
The Classic doubled the power of the classic red hand vac with an added HEPA Filter and a bagless dirt cup.

Broom Vac 
In 1987 the Broom Vac debuted. The original Dirt Devil Broom vac was a plastic bodied, metal handles, rear bagged quick pick up vacuum cleaner. They were very well known then, but most broke due to quality of materials used to manufacture it. Today, the original Broom Vac remains in some places, being preserved by collectors because of its rarity. The next Broom Vac after the corded model had finished production was a rechargeable stick vacuum used for mostly bare floors; the user sweeps with it and vacuums the pile; it does not require bags.

In 2005 Dirt Devil came out with a completely different Broom Vac, with nine color options, longer battery life, and more suction.

AccuCharge 
In June 2008, Dirt Devil introduced a line of cordless handheld vacuums with AccuCharge Technology. AccuCharge is the first cordless vacuum line that is Energy Star approved and reduces 70% in energy consumption compared to most cordless vacuums. The cordless hand vac & stick vac are the first in the AccuCharge lineup.

Slogans 
"Nothing escapes the power of a Dirt Devil" (1995–2005) 
"Fight Dirty" (2005–2014)
"Let's Go" (2013–present)

The UK Company 
Dirt Devil UK is part of Pulse Home Products Ltd and develops upright, cylinder, and handheld vacuum cleaners for the UK and Ireland.

References

External links
 Official Dirt Devil website
 Official Dirt Devil UK website
 Official Dirt Devil German website

Vacuum cleaner manufacturers
Electronics companies established in 1905
Home appliance manufacturers of the United States
1905 establishments in Ohio